The German battleship Tirpitz was attacked on multiple occasions by Allied forces during World War II. While most of the attacks failed to inflict any damage on the battleship, she was placed out of action for a lengthy period following the Operation Source midget submarine attack on 22 September 1943 and for a short period after the Operation Tungsten aircraft carrier strike on 3 April 1944. Tirpitz suffered severe and irreparable damage after being hit by a Tallboy bomb during the Operation Paravane air raid on 15 September 1944, and was sunk with heavy loss of life in the Operation Catechism raid on 12 November that year.

List of attacks

References
Citations

Works consulted

Aerial operations and battles of World War II
Arctic naval operations of World War II
Tirpitz
Allied attacks of the Tirpitz